Sergio Casal and Emilio Sánchez were the defending champions, but did not participate this year.

Wayne Ferreira and Jim Grabb won the title, defeating Grant Connell and Glenn Michibata 6–4, 6–3 in the final.

Seeds

  Grant Connell /  Glenn Michibata (final)
  Wayne Ferreira /  Jim Grabb (champions)
  Paul Haarhuis /  Mark Koevermans (quarterfinals)
  Charles Beckman /  Sven Salumaa (first round)

Draw

Draw

External links
Draw

ATP Auckland Open
1992 ATP Tour